GUN Records (Great Unlimited Noises) was a record label located in Bochum, Germany, founded in 1992 by Bogdan Kopec (DRAKKAR Promotion Musikverlag GmbH) and Wolfgang Funk.

Different artists on the label have had hit singles as well as albums in Europe. A branch of the label known as Supersonic Records existed until 2005, when GUN's parent company BMG merged with Sony. In 2009, GUN Records announced they were closing.

Former artists

All Ends
Alien Boys
Apocalyptica
Apoptygma Berzerk
Bullet for My Valentine
Dark
Die Happy
Donots
Eagles of Death Metal
Exilia
Flyleaf
L'Âme Immortelle
Lordi
Lovex
Oomph!
Sturm und Drang
Van Canto
Within Temptation
Blackeyed Blonde
Depressive Age
Doctor Butcher
Eloy
Grave Digger
Guano Apes
HIM
House of Spirits
Kick Back
Krisiun
Kreator
Kyyria
Mind Odyssey
Monkeys With Tools
Paradise Lost
Rage
Richthofen
Running Wild
Secret Discovery
SITD
Sodom
Sun
T.A.S.S.
Terry Kelly
Three Days Grace
Thunderhead
Tom Angelripper
U.D.O.

See also
 List of record labels

Heavy metal record labels
Rock record labels
Alternative rock record labels
Record labels established in 1992
Record labels disestablished in 2009
Defunct record labels of Germany